The Tanganyika laughter epidemic of 1962 was an outbreak of mass hysteria—or mass psychogenic illness (MPI)—rumored to have occurred in or near the village of Kashasha on the western coast of Lake Victoria in Tanganyika (which, once united with Zanzibar, became the modern nation of Tanzania) near the border with Uganda.

History

The laughter epidemic began on January 31, 1962, at a mission-run boarding school for girls in Kashasha. It started with three girls and spread throughout the school, affecting 95 of the 159 pupils, aged 12–18. Symptoms lasted from a few hours to 16 days. The teaching staff were unaffected and reported that students were unable to concentrate on their lessons. The school closed on March 18.

The epidemic spread to Nshamba, a village where several of the girls lived. In April and May, 217 mostly young villagers had laughing attacks. The Kashasha school reopened on May 21 and reclosed at the end of June. Earlier that month, the laughing epidemic spread to Ramashenye girls' middle school, near Bukoba, affecting 48 girls.

The Kashasha school was sued for allowing the children and their parents to transmit it to the surrounding area. Other schools, Kashasha itself, and another village were affected to some degree. The phenomenon died off 18 months after it started. The laughter reports were widely accompanied by descriptions of pain, fainting, respiratory problems, rashes, and crying. In all, 14 schools were shut down and 1000 people were affected.

Causes

Linguist  has theorized that the episode was stress-induced. In 1962, Tanganyika had just won its independence, he said,  and students had reported feeling stressed because of higher expectations by teachers and parents. MPI, he says, usually occurs in people without a lot of power. "MPI is a last resort for people of a low status. It's an easy way for them to express that something is wrong."

Sociologist Robert Bartholomew and psychiatrist Simon Wessely both put forward a culture-specific epidemic hysteria hypothesis, pointing out that the occurrences in 1960s Africa were prevalent in missionary schools and Tanganyikan society was ruled by strict traditional elders, so the likelihood is the hysteria was a manifestation of the cultural dissonance between the "traditional conservatism" at home and the new ideas challenging those beliefs in school, which they termed 'conversion reactions'.

See also
 List of mass hysteria cases
 Dancing mania

References

External links
 
 Article from CBC News
 WNYC radio program with a section discussing the epidemic

1962 in Tanganyika
Laughter
Mass psychogenic illness